Beebe is an unincorporated community in Edmunds County, in the U.S. state of South Dakota. Other than a small manufactury, there are no businesses or services at Beebe and only three houses.

History
A post office at Beebe was established in 1911, and remained in operation until 1950. The community was named in honor of Marcus Beebe, a local banker.

References

Unincorporated communities in Edmunds County, South Dakota
Unincorporated communities in South Dakota